Down Home is a 1920 American silent drama film written, directed, and produced by Irvin Willat and starring Leatrice Joy and James Barrows. It was distributed by the independent film distributor W. W. Hodkinson. A copy survives at the Library of Congress.

The film is based on the novel Dabney Todd, by F. N. Westcott, which was also probably a basis of Something to Think About, directed by Cecil B. DeMille, which was produced at the same time.

Cast
 Leatrice Joy as Nance Pelot
 James O. Barrows as Dabney Todd (credited as James Barrows)
 Edward Hearn as Chet Todd
 Aggie Herring as Mrs. Todd
 Edward Nolan as Martin Doover
 William Robert Daly as Joe Pelot (credited as Robert Daly)
 Sidney Franklin as Cash Bailey (credited as Sidney A. Franklin)
 Bert Hadley as Reverence Mr. Blake
 Frank Braidwood as Larry Shayne
 James Robert Chandler as Deacon Howe (credited as Robert Chandler)
 Nelson McDowell as Lige Conklin
 Florence Gilbert as Clerk
 J. P. Lockney as Barney Shayne, Larry's Father
 William Sloan as Townsman (credited as William Sloane)
 Helen Gilmore as Townswoman

References

External links

 
 

1920 films
1920 drama films
Silent American drama films
American silent feature films
American black-and-white films
Films directed by Irvin Willat
Films based on American novels
American independent films
Films distributed by W. W. Hodkinson Corporation
1920s independent films
1920s American films